Martin Hubmann (born 14 May 1989) is a Swiss orienteering competitor, world champion and European champion. He was a member of the relay team that won gold medals at the 2012 European Orienteering Championships in Falun. He won a gold medal in the sprint relay with the Swiss team at the 2014 World Orienteering Championships.

Hubmann is the younger brother of orienteering champion Daniel Hubmann.

References

External links

1989 births
Living people
Swiss orienteers
Male orienteers
Foot orienteers
World Orienteering Championships medalists
Junior World Orienteering Championships medalists